William Robinson (born December 20, 1984) is a former American football offensive tackle. He played college football at San Diego State.

Early years
Robinson grew up in Pomona, California and attended Bishop Amat High School.

College career
Robinson was a two-year starter for San Diego State.

Professional career
Robinson was signed by the Seattle Seahawks as an undrafted free agent in 2008. He was released by the Seattle Seahawks in September 2009. He later played for the Washington Redskins, New Orleans Saints and Jacksonville Jaguars.  Robinson was picked up by the New Orleans Saints and activated for the November 25, 2012 game against the San Francisco 49ers.  He took over for Bryce Harris at offensive right tackle in the 1st quarter after Harris went down with an ankle injury.  Robinson played solid through the 1st half, with no sacks or tackles made by defenders he engaged with.

External links

Seattle Seahawks bio
San Diego Aztecs bio

1984 births
Living people
Players of American football from California
American football offensive tackles
San Diego State Aztecs football players
Seattle Seahawks players
Sportspeople from Pomona, California
Washington Redskins players
Jacksonville Jaguars players
New Orleans Saints players